Eulomogo is a town in the Dubbo Regional Council, New South Wales, Australia. It has a population of 1,373.

References

Towns in New South Wales